Merrie England is an influential collection of essays on socialism by Robert Blatchford under the pseudonym "Nunquam", published in 1893. The first issue by Nunquam was priced at one shilling. It sold over two million copies worldwide. It was said that for every one convert to socialism made by Karl Marx's Das Kapital there were a hundred converts made by “Merrie England” – though even this may be an underestimate.

The book received rebuttals including:
R. Nemo, Labour and Luxury: A Reply to 'Merrie England''' London: Walter Scott, 1895 
Robert Roberts, England's Ruin, Or John Smith's Answer to Mr. Blatchford's Plea for Socialism'' 1895

References

External links

1893 non-fiction books
1893 in England
Books about England
Political history of England
Literature of England
Essay collections
Socialist publications